The 2014 Central American and Caribbean Junior Championships were held at the Complejo Deportivo Bicentenario in Morelia, Michoacán, Mexico, between 4–6 July 2014.

In the junior category, a total of 43 events were contested, 21 by boys and 22 by girls, whereas in the youth category, a total of 42 events were contested, 21 by boys and 21 by girls.

Medal summary
Complete results can be found on the Central American and Caribbean Athletic Confederation webpage.

Boys U-20 (Junior)

Girls U-20 (Junior)

Boys U-18 (Youth)

Girls U-18 (Youth)

Medal table
An unofficial medal count is in agreement with published official numbers.

Participation
According to an unofficial count, 431 athletes from 24 countries participated.

 (2)
 (2)
 (1)
 (31)
 (12)
 (2)
 (12)
 (6)
 (10)
 (3)
 (21)
 (12)
 (4)
 (11)
 (3)
 (54)
 (147)
 (9)
 (35)
 (2)
 (4)
 (2)
 (1)
 (45)

References

External links
Official CACAC Website
Full results (archived)

Central American and Caribbean Junior Championships in Athletics
Central American and Caribbean Junior Championships in Athletics
Central American and Caribbean Junior Championships in Athletics
Central American and Caribbean Junior Championships in Athletics
Central American and Caribbean Junior Championships in Athletics
21st century in Michoacán
Central American and Caribbean Junior Championships in Athletics
International athletics competitions hosted by Mexico
Central American and Caribbean Junior Championships in Athletics
Central American and Caribbean Junior Championships in Athletics
Morelia
Sport in Michoacán